Gwynedd Council in North Wales is elected, as a whole, every 4 years. In 2014 the National Assembly for Wales deferred all local elections in Wales to 2017. The council is composed of 74 councillors.

Political control
Since 1999, political control has been held by the following parties:

Council elections
1995 Gwynedd Council election
1999 Gwynedd Council election
2004 Gwynedd Council election
2008 Gwynedd Council election
2012 Gwynedd Council election
2017 Gwynedd Council election

By-election results

2012

This election was scheduled to take place as part of the 2012 Gwynedd Council election but was delayed as no candidates were nominated for the seat vacated by retirement of Independent Councillor Arwel Pierce.

2015

2016

The Marchog by-election was triggered by the resignation of Councillor Chris O'Neal, an Independent, after he'd admitted assaulting a taxi-driver.

The by-election was triggered by the resignation of Councillor Siân Gwenllian of Plaid Cymru after her election to the Welsh Assembly as Member for Arfon.

The by-election was triggered by the resignation of Councillor Eurig Wyn of Plaid Cymru.

References